Leucas penduliflora is a species of flowering plant in the family Lamiaceae. It is found only in Yemen. Its natural habitat is subtropical or tropical dry shrubland.

References

penduliflora
Endemic flora of Socotra
Threatened flora of Asia
Vulnerable plants
Taxonomy articles created by Polbot